Kohneh Lahijan (also Romanized as Kohneh Lāhījān and Kohneh Lāhījān Parise Iran) is a village in Piran Rural District, in the Central District of Piranshahr County, West Azerbaijan Province, Iran. At the 2006 census, its population was 957, in 170 families.

References 

Populated places in Piranshahr County